Grabin  is a village in the administrative district of Gmina Niemodlin, within Opole County, Opole Voivodeship, in south-western Poland.

During that era, the name was spelled Grüben (Geeman), and its county was named “Falkenburg.” For the most part, citizens of German descent removed from Grüben/Grabin at the end of World War Two. According to reporter John Sack in his book An Eye For An Eye, a particularly macabre yet little known atrocity took place here when a number of German women residing in the village were forced by armed Poles to exhume rotting corpses buried in a mass grave by the SS. These women were forced into close contact with the bodies, and as Sack describes in graphic detail, were made to "kiss and make love" with the corpses, which were infected with typhus. The women were subsequently interned at the former Lamsdorf camp, where they were not able to shower, and 64 of them subsequently died.

The village had a population of 645 as of 2015.

References

Grabin